The 2016 Stevenage Borough Council election took place on 5 May 2016 to elect members of Stevenage Borough Council in England. This was on the same day as other local elections. One third of the council was up for election; the seats which were last contested in 2012. The Labour Party retained control of the council, which it had held continuously since 1973.

Results

Ward Results

Bandley Hill

Bedwell

Chells

Longmeadow

Manor

Martins Wood

Old Town

Pin Green

Roebuck

St Nicholas

Shephall

Symonds Green

Woodfield

References

2016 English local elections
2016
2010s in Hertfordshire